David Charles Cummings (16 December 1861 – 16 April 1942), known as D. C. Cummings, was a British trade unionist.

Born in Greenwich, Cummings was apprenticed in the shipbuilding industry at the age of 14.  He joined the United Society of Boilermakers and Iron and Steel Shipbuilders in 1880, becoming active in Leeds, where he was elected to the school board in 1898.  He was also active in the Independent Labour Party.  He was General Secretary of the union from 1900, and in 1906, he served as President of the Trades Union Congress.  In 1908, he left his trade union posts to work for the Board of Trade, and had a lengthy career in the civil service, including membership of the Industrial Court from 1919 until 1940.  In 1927, he was elected to Lewisham Borough Council.

References

External links
 

1861 births
1942 deaths
Councillors in Greater London
Independent Labour Party politicians
General Secretaries of the Amalgamated Society of Boilermakers
Members of the Parliamentary Committee of the Trades Union Congress
People from Greenwich
Presidents of the Trades Union Congress